Yuanxi is a town in Cangxi County, in Sichuan province, China. , it has one residential community and 17 villages under its administration.

References

Township-level divisions of Sichuan
Cangxi County